The 1998–99 Missouri Tigers men's basketball team represented the University of Missouri during the 1998–99 NCAA men's college basketball season. The Tigers were led by legendary coach Norm Stewart in his 32nd and final season at the school.

Roster

Schedule

|-
!colspan=9 style=| Regular Season

|-
!colspan=9 style=| Big 12 Tournament

|-
!colspan=9 style=| NCAA Tournament

References

Missouri Tigers men's basketball seasons
Missouri
Missouri
1999 in sports in Missouri
Tiger